Soyoung Lee is an art historian and curator. She is the Landon and Lavinia Clay Chief Curator of the Harvard Art Museums.

Biography 
Lee was born in Jakarta, where her father was a Korean diplomat tasked with promoting Korean art and culture, and has lived in Stockholm, London, Los Angeles, Seoul, and Tokyo. She received her B.A., M.A., and Ph.D., all from Columbia University. Her doctoral thesis examined the influence of 15th-16th century Korean ceramics on the ceramic industries in Kyushu, Japan.

Lee joined the Metropolitan Museum of Art in 2003 and was assistant curator, associate curator, and curator in the museum's Asian Art Department. At the time of her hiring, she was the Met's first curator of Korean art. Her research has focused on cross-cultural exchanges in East Asian Art. At the Met, she has curated the exhibitions such as Art of the Korean Renaissance, 1400–1600 (2009); Poetry in Clay: Korean Buncheong Ceramics from the Leeum, Samsung Museum of Art (2011); Silla: Korea’s Golden Kingdom (2014); and Diamond Mountains: Travel and Nostalgia in Korean Art (2018).

Lee served as the Met's Forum of Curators, Conservators, and Scientists in 2016–17 and a trustee of the Association of Art Museum Curators.

In 2018, Lee was hired by Harvard Art Museums to serve as its new chief curator.

References 

Living people
Year of birth missing (living people)
American art historians
American art curators
Indonesian people of Korean descent
People associated with the Metropolitan Museum of Art
Columbia College (New York) alumni
Columbia Graduate School of Arts and Sciences alumni
Harvard University people
People from Jakarta
American academics of Korean descent
American women curators